The 1934–35 NCAA football bowl games were the final games of the 1934 college football season, and featured the debut of the Sugar Bowl and the Orange Bowl, which complemented the only previous annual post-season game, the Rose Bowl. The Sun Bowl was also played for the first time, but with non-collegiate teams.

The Orange Bowl was hosted by the local team, the Miami Hurricanes, who faced the invited Bucknell Bison. Likewise, the Sugar Bowl was also hosted by the in-town team (the Tulane Green Wave), and also invited a Pennsylvania club as their opponents, the Temple Owls. The Rose Bowl featured two national powerhouses, the Stanford Indians of the West and the Alabama Crimson Tide from the South. Alabama's victory sealed their undefeated season and ended Stanford's, leaving Minnesota the only other undefeated team in the US.

Poll rankings
The first AP Poll for college football was taken in mid-November 1934; it would not become a regular occurrence until the 1936 season. The below table lists top teams, their win–loss records at the time the poll was taken, and the bowls they later played in. Contemporary polls later named different national champions; the Dickinson System chose Minnesota, while the Dunkel System selected Alabama.

 The Big Ten Conference did not allow its members to participate in bowl games until the 1947 Rose Bowl.

Bowl schedule

 The inaugural Sun Bowl was contested between high school teams.

Game recaps

Rose Bowl

Sugar Bowl

Orange Bowl

References